Flipside Tactics (stylized as FlipSid3 Tactics) was an esports organization based in the United States. Flipside had teams competing in Counter-Strike: Global Offensive, Halo, Crossfire, fighting games, StarCraft II, iRacing, Tom Clancy's Rainbow Six Siege, Rocket League, and Dota 2. Former professional football player Ricky Lumpkin was a co-owner of the team.

Counter-Strike 
The team had a Counter-Strike: Global Offensive based in Ukraine. They have previously hosted three Swedish squads, as well as a South African academy team.

Roster

Tournament results 
Bold denotes a CS:GO Major
 9–12th — DreamHack Winter 2014
 13–16th — ESL One Katowice 2015
 1st — CIS Championship Voronezh
 9–12th — ESL One Cologne 2015
 3rd-4th — Electronic Sports World Cup 2015
 13–16th — DreamHack Open Cluj-Napoca 2015
 13–16th — MLG Major Championship: Columbus
 5-8th — ESL One Cologne 2016
 11-14th — ELEAGUE Season 1
 5-8th — StarLadder i-League StarSeries Season 2
 5-6th — DreamHack Winter 2016
 1st — DreamHack Leipzig 2017
 15-16th — ELEAGUE Major 2017 
 9-11th — PGL 2017 Kraków Major Championship

Rocket League 

In 2015, Flipside acquired the roster from the team Teamy Weamy. On August 7, 2016, Flipside lost to iBUYPOWER Cosmic in the very first Rocket League Championship Series finals, placing second. Shortly after Michael "M1k3Rules" Costello left the team and was subsequently replaced by Marius "gReazymeister" Ranheim from Northern Gaming. On December 4, 2016, Flipside defeated Mockit Aces to win the Rocket League Championship Series for Season 2.

On February 28, 2019, it was announced that the roster that had won WSOE 4 a month prior had chosen to not re-sign with Flipside. With the departure of the roster, it was also announced that Flipside would not be participating in RLCS Season 7, ending the reign of the longest standing organization within Rocket League.

Former roster

Tournament results (majors) 
 1st - Rocket League MLG Championship Series Season 1 Final
 2nd — Rocket League Championship Series Season 1 Final
 1st — Rocket League Championship Series Season 2 Final
 5th — Rocket League Championship Series Season 3 Final
 1st - DreamHack Summer 2017
 5-6th — Rocket League Championship Series Season 4 Final
 5-8th — DreamHack Open Leipzig
 5-6th — Rocket League Championship Series Season 6 Final
 1st - WSOE 4: The Rocket League Showdown

Fighting games 
The Flipside Tactics FGC team was founded in August 2015 by Chris "NinjaCW" Harris. NinjaCW died on October 9, 2016. He was replaced by Matthew "Glitch" Testini as the new manager on October 28, 2016.

References 

Esports teams based in the United States
Counter-Strike teams
Halo (franchise) teams
Fighting game player sponsors
Defunct and inactive Overwatch teams
Rocket League teams
Tom Clancy's Rainbow Six Siege teams